Ganarake scalaris is an extinct species of primitive Lichen-like enigma, possibly within the division Mucoromycota first informally described as enigmatic cap-carbonate tubestones from basal Ediacaran sediments of the South Californian Noonday Formation. Doubts about their creator and what they represent were dubious and were at first thought to have been made by marine precipitation  at the end of the Snowball (Slush-ball) Earth. However, permineralized organic structures within the tubes with hyphae, spheroidal cells attached to the tubes and a remarkable organization of a thallus had remarkable similarities between Lichens. Ganarake has an isotopic composition and size comparable to a chlorophyte alga.

Etymology 

Part of the genus name gan is named in honour of Ediacaran fungi Tian Gan at the University of Colorado Boulder that discovered similar fungi. The second half of the name arake is Greek for bowl. Scalaris refers to its ladder-like appearance as it branches in both Y and H-like forms.

Discovery 
Even though the tubestones from the formation are now regarded as being of biological origin, they were originally interpreted as Fluid escape structures or unique inverted Stromatoliths. Historical evidence for a third option (lichenized fungi preserved in their growth positions) since the formation that G. scalaris was described from was compatible with the idea of marine Lichens. Various observations involving microscopes were viable for confirming a fungal affinity as such this technique was performed on the fossils and it revealed two layers of preserved organic material that all come together to form the aforementioned thallus. These layers are 1. Rectangular-cubic cells making up an upper cortex 2. A layer of spheroidal cells punctured and enveloped by slender hyphae 3. Medulla made out of the hyphae and 4. Lower cortex as thick as a few cells elaborated by intervals into multicellular rhizines extending down into the base of the sediment.

Description 
The cups branch off from a wide, possibly originally hollow, central hollow. Because the hollow is interpreted as originally being hollow before preservation and death of the organism it would explain why it's filled with sparry Dolomite. These cup-shaped flanges consist of radially arranged, branching both pinnately & dichotomously from septate hyphae and expand until they define the cups foliose thalli, they are in turn overgrown by oxalated and carbonated crystals; In thin sections, they may be reminiscent to thin ropes. When viewing the thalli in macerates they are flattened and foliose. While using scanning electron micrographs, the aforementioned 4 layers start to appear in Ganarake.

See also 
List of Ediacaran genera

References 

Ediacaran
Ediacaran life
Fossils of California
Fungus genera
Death Valley
Taxa described in 2022
Prehistoric fungi
Lichen genera
Prehistoric North America